Alexei Andreyvich Melnichuk (born 29 June 1998) is a Russian professional ice hockey goaltender currently playing for Avangard Omsk of the Kontinental Hockey League (KHL).

Playing career
Melnichuk played professionally in his native Russia, with SKA Saint Petersburg and Torpedo Nizhny Novgorod of the Kontinental Hockey League (KHL) before signing as an undrafted free agent to an entry-level contract with the San Jose Sharks in May 2020.

During his maiden North American season in the 2020–21 campaign, he made his NHL debut with the Sharks appearing in relief on 11 February 2021, in a 6–2 defeat to the Los Angeles Kings. He was handed his first start on 8 May 2021, in a 4–5 overtime loss to the Arizona Coyotes.

In the following  season, Melnichuk continued in the AHL with the San Jose Barracuda. As the starting goaltender, Melnichuk collected 10 wins through 31 regular season games. At the NHL trade deadline, Melnichuk was dealt by the Sharks to the Tampa Bay Lightning in exchange for Antoine Morand on 21 March 2022. He was immediately re-assigned to the Lightning's ECHL affiliate, the Orlando Solar Bears.

After completing the season with the Solar Bears, Melnichuk's KHL rights were traded by SKA Saint Petersburg to HC Sochi on 6 May 2022. Opting to halt his North American career, Melnichuk was later signed by Sochi to a two-year contract on 11 May 2022.

During the 2022–23 season, Melnichuk made 8 appearances with Sochi before he was initially loaned to Traktor Chelyabinsk for the remainder of the season on 21 October 2022. After two months with Traktor, Melnichuk was again on the move and signed a two-way contract with Avangard Omsk on 21 December 2022.

Career statistics

Regular season and playoffs

International

References

External links

1999 births
Living people
Expatriate ice hockey players in the United States
Orlando Solar Bears (ECHL) players
Russian expatriate ice hockey people
Russian expatriate sportspeople in the United States
Russian ice hockey goaltenders
San Jose Barracuda players
San Jose Sharks players
SKA Saint Petersburg players
SKA-Neva players
SKA-1946 players
Ice hockey people from Saint Petersburg
HC Sochi players
Torpedo Nizhny Novgorod players
Traktor Chelyabinsk players
Undrafted National Hockey League players